Koromo is a rural commune in the Cercle of Koutiala in the Sikasso Region of southern Mali. The commune covers an area of 263 square kilometers and includes 5 settlements. In the 2009 census it had a population of 10,890. The village of Bongosso, the administrative centre (chef-lieu) of the commune, is 45 km northeast of Koutiala.

References

Communes of Sikasso Region